ITD may refer to:
 Income Tax Department, Government of India's department for direct taxes
 Idaho Transportation Department
 Impedance threshold device, a valve used in cardiopulmonary resuscitation (CPR)
 Information Technology Directorate (formerly the Information Engineering Directorate) of the United Kingdom government Department of Trade and Industry
 Inter-type declaration, a feature of Aspect-oriented computer programming.
 Interaural time difference, the difference in arrival time of a sound between two ears
 Internal tandem duplication, a form of mutation (see gene duplication and tandem exon duplication)